The Taitung Story Museum or Eslite Taitung Story Museum is a museum in Taitung City, Taitung County, Taiwan.

History
The museum building was built on the site of the former Taitung Land Administration Office pursuant to a petition to the local government in 2004.

Architecture
The building was designed with Japanese architecture.

Transportation
The museum is within walking distance of Yangmei Station of Taiwan Railways.

See also
 List of museums in Taiwan

References

2004 establishments in Taiwan
Literary museums in Taiwan
Museums established in 2004
Museums in Taitung County